Salomón Villada Hoyos (born 19 August 1992), better known by his stage name Feid, is a Colombian singer and songwriter. Born in Medellín, Colombia, he has worked with several well-known singers such as J Balvin, Sebastián Yatra, Maluma and Karol G.

Biography 
Feid was born on 19 August 1992 in Medellín, Colombia. He is the son of Berta Lucía Hoyos, a preschool teacher and psychologist. His father, Jorge Mario Villada, is a university professor in arts. His sister Manuela Villada Hoyos is currently a graphic design student. He attended the Music Extension Courses offered by the university of Antioquia in the city of Medellín.

In his childhood, he learned to play clarinet, which he then later abandoned after he decided he wanted to start singing. When he later went to college, he took singing classes and sung in front of his friends. He also was in the college choir. He finally decided to start focusing on making reggaeton music. He also sung at college parties, birthday parties, and reunions. Despite being a reggaeton artist, he prefers hip-hop and R&B and follows artists like Drake, T-Pain, and Chris Brown. He became a reggaeton artist because he felt that it was more popular with younger generations.

He has recently worked with several well-known artists like J Balvin and Sebastián Yatra. He also helped write the popular reggaeton song by J Balvin called "Ginza".

The song "Dorado", in which he collaborated with Italian musicians Mahmood and Sfera Ebbasta, was released on 10 July 2020.

Discography

Studio albums

Mixtapes

Collaborative albums

Extended plays

Singles

As main artist

As featured artist

Other charted songs

References 

21st-century Colombian male singers
1992 births
Living people
People from Medellín
Latin music songwriters